Kang Sue-jin (born 24 April 1967) is a South Korean ballerina. She is a principal dancer at Stuttgart Ballet.

Early life
Kang Sue-jin was born in Seoul, South Korea. After initial ballet lessons at Sun Hwa Arts Middle School, where she majored in Korean traditional dance, she continued her education at Sun Hwa Arts High School until 1982. Following graduation from high school, Kang went to Marika Besobrasova at Monte Carlo Dance School. In 1986, she became a member of the Stuttgart Ballet, where she was appointed Soloist in 1994 and Principal Dancer in 1997.

Following her long career as a ballet dancer, Kang was awarded an honorary degree from Sookmyung Women's University in 2016.

Career
Kang joined Stuttgart Ballet in 1986 and was its first and youngest Asian ballerina.

In 2002, Kang appeared in Die Kameliendame and two years later, she performed with Benito Marcellino in Cranko's Onegin. Following the 2016 performance of the same ballet with Jason Reilly as partner, Kang had retired from performance.

In 2003, Kang debuted in USA in a role of Juliet from Cranko's Romeo and Juliet opposite to Romeo role by Filip Barankiewicz. In 2008, Kang reprised the role of Juliet in the same ballet.

In 2013, Kang published her first memoir titled I Don't Wait for Tomorrow. The same year she also became an honorary ambassador of PyeongChang at the 2018 Winter Olympics.

In 2015, Kang performed in John Neumeier's Die Kameliendame in her hometown Seoul, South Korea and the same year appeared in Cranco's Onegin at Seoul Arts Center where she sang the "Swan song".

In 2017, Kang became a jury member of the Prix de Lausanne, Prix Benois de la Danse. and of the Beijing International Ballet and Choreography Competition.

Featured performances
1992 Mata Hari
1992 Romeo and Juliet
1993 The Magic Flute
1994 The Sleeping Beauty
1996 Giselle
1997 The Hunchback of Notre Dame
1998 Die Kameliendame
1999 Gala performance - Korea's best Ballerina
2006 Korean Nat'l Ballet, 2006 New Year's Gala
2008 Appeared at Lotte Dept. Store CF.
2016 The Lady and the Fool

Honours and awards
Won a scholarship of Prix de Lausanne in 1985  
Recipient of the Korean Young Artist Award, 1998
Recipient of the Best Female Ballerina Award at the Prix Benois de la Danse, 1999
National Hwa-Gwan Order of Cultural Merit by the Ministry of Culture, Sports and Tourism (South Korea), 1999
Ho-Am Prize in the Arts, 2001
Recipient of the German title “Kammertänzerin” (German: Royal Court Dancer), 2007
Recipient of the John Cranko Award, 2007
Order of Merit of Baden-Württemberg, 2014
Order of Cultural Merit, 2018

In 1998, German Orchid Society named an orchid from the Phalaenopsis genus in her honor.

See also
Stuttgart Ballet

References

External links
Kang Sue-Jin, Stuttgart Ballet Interview at CriticalDance.com

1967 births
Living people
Prix Benois de la Danse winners
Recipients of the Order of Cultural Merit (Korea)
Recipients of the Order of Merit of Baden-Württemberg
Prix de Lausanne winners
South Korean ballerinas
South Korean expatriates in Germany
People from Seoul
Korea National Ballet
20th-century ballet dancers
21st-century ballet dancers
Recipients of the Ho-Am Prize in the Arts